Nora Chipaumire is a choreographer and performer born in Zimbabwe in 1965 and currently based in Brooklyn, NYC. Her work focuses on racial and gender stereotypes.

Nora, a documentary film based on her life, was released in 2008.

Sources

1965 births
Living people
Zimbabwean choreographers
Zimbabwean emigrants to the United States